Gilbert LaFreniere (born 1934 in New York) is an American ecological philosopher, active in the study of geology, ecology, and human impact upon nature.

Biography 

Gilbert attended the University of Massachusetts Amherst and earned a Masters of Geology from Dartmouth College before completing a Ph.D in intellectual history from the University of California at Santa Barbara, (UCSB) in 1976.

LaFreniere taught geology, environmental ethics, and environmental history for more than twenty-five years at Willamette University in Salem, Oregon. He remains an active Professor Emeritus and continues to lecture on the transformation of natural landscapes by man, appearing at Willamette University, Portland State University, and Oregon State University in the last few years. Many of his lectures rely heavily on his own travels and photography of the national parks of Europe, New England, California, the Pacific Northwest, and Canada.

LaFreniere is also a noted scholar of the work and thought of the French philosopher Jean-Jacques Rousseau and the Idea of Progress and appears in the Card Catalog of the Rousseau Library in Montmorency, France. Gilbert's most recent book is The Decline of Nature (2008). Among his other publications are the book Jean Jacques Rousseau and the Idea of Progress (1976) and articles in Environmental History Review, Agriculture and Human Values, and The Trumpeter.

See also
Environmental ethics
Environmental philosophy
Jean-Jacques Rousseau
Natural philosophy
List of environmental philosophers
List of historians of science

References

External links 

Green thinkers
1935 births
Living people
Historians of science
Intellectual historians
Environmental historians
Willamette University faculty
Activists from New York City